The Michigan presidential primary may refer to:
Michigan Democratic primary, 2008
Michigan Republican primary, 2008

2008 United States presidential primaries by state